Aditi Singh (born 15 November 1987) is an Indian politician. She is an MLA from the constituency of Rae Bareli in the state of Uttar Pradesh, having won the seat in 2017 and 2022. She was one of the youngest members of Uttar Pradesh's 17th Vidhan Sabha (2017-2022). She left Congress and joined BJP in 2021. In 2019, she was attacked by goons in a report of political rivalry with Dinesh Pratap Singh.

Early life 
Her father Akhilesh Kumar Singh was a five time representative of Raebareli Sadar for multiple political parties. Aditi was educated in Delhi and Mussorie before attending Duke University in the United States for a degree in management. She was involved in social work before her political career.

Career 
She won the assembly election in 2017 by a margin of more than 90,000 votes on a Congress ticket. After she was suspended from Congress  for her connection with BJP, on 24 November she officially joined BJP. She is married to Angad Singh Saini, an MLA in Punjab Legislative Assembly from Nawanshahr constituency.

References

External links

1987 births
Living people
Women in Uttar Pradesh politics
Uttar Pradesh MLAs 2017–2022
21st-century Indian women politicians
21st-century Indian politicians
People from Raebareli
Fuqua School of Business alumni
Indian National Congress politicians
Bharatiya Janata Party politicians from Uttar Pradesh
Uttar Pradesh MLAs 2022–2027